In the Soup is a 1992 independent comedy directed by Alexandre Rockwell, and written by Rockwell and Sollace Mitchell (credited as Tim Kissell). It stars Steve Buscemi as Aldolfo Rollo, a self-conscious screenwriter who has written an unfilmable 500-page screenplay and is looking for a producer.

Plot
Tortured by self-doubt, financial ruin, and unrequited passion for his next door neighbor, Aldolfo Rollo places an ad offering his mammoth screenplay to the highest bidder. In steps Aldolfo's "guardian angel" Joe, a fast-talking, high-rolling gangster who promises to produce the film but has his own unique ideas regarding film financing.

Cast
 Steve Buscemi as Adolfo Rollo
 Seymour Cassel as Joe
 Jennifer Beals as Angelica Pena
 Pat Moya as Dang
 Will Patton as Skippy
 Sully Boyar as Old Man
 Steven Randazzo as Louis Barfardi
 Francesco Messina as Frank Barfardi
 Jim Jarmusch as Monty
 Carol Kane as Barbara
 Stanley Tucci as Gregoire
 Rockets Redglare as Guy
 Elizabeth Bracco as Jackie
 Debi Mazar as Suzie
 Sam Rockwell as Paulie
 Paul Herman as E-Z Rent-A-Car Clerk

In popular culture

The film and its history are discussed in depth in John Pierson's account of the independent American film 'scene' of the late 1980s/early 1990s, Spike, Mike, Slackers, & Dykes: A Guided Tour Across a Decade of American Independent Cinema.

A Kickstarter project started in July 2017 with hopes of restoring the archival print and re-releasing the film for its 25th anniversary. The restored print was released by Factory 25 in 2018.

References

External links

1992 films
1992 comedy-drama films
American comedy-drama films
American independent films
Films about filmmaking
Films directed by Alexandre Rockwell
1992 independent films
1990s English-language films
1990s American films